Alain Richard (born 1 May 1985) is a Swiss ski mountaineer.

Selected results 
 2002:
 1st, Patrouille de la Maya B-course, together with Marcel Marti and William Marti
 2003:
 1st (juniors), Trophée des Gastlosen, together with Marcel Marti
 2004:
 1st, Trophée des Gastlosen, together with Pierre Bruchez
 3rd, World Championship relay race (together with Alexander Hug, Pierre Bruchez and Rico Elmer)
 2005:
 1st (espoirs), Trophée des Gastlosen, together with Pierre Bruchez
 2006:
 6th  "senior I" class ranking, Patrouille des Glaciers (together with Mathieu Charvoz and Pierre Bruchez)

External links 
 Alain Richard at Skimountaineering.org

References 

1985 births
Living people
Swiss male ski mountaineers